Typocerus acuticauda is a species of flower longhorn in the beetle family Cerambycidae. It is found in North America.

Subspecies
These two subspecies belong to the species Typocerus acuticauda:
 Typocerus acuticauda acuticauda Casey, 1913
 Typocerus acuticauda standishi Knull, 1938

References

Further reading

External links

 

Lepturinae
Articles created by Qbugbot
Beetles described in 1913